Albert Carnelly (29 December 1870 – 18 August 1920) was an English footballer who played as an inside forward. He made over 200 appearances scoring 116 goals in first team league football. Carnelly made 80 Football League appearances scoring 34 goals, 58 Midland League appearances scoring 44 goals and 75 Southern League appearances scoring 38 goals in the years 1890 to 1901 before the First World War.

Career
Albert Carnelly played locally for Notts County before turning professional with Loughborough in December 1890. Carnelly joined Nottingham Forest in May 1894 playing two seasons in Division One before dropping into Division Two in May 1896 for a season with Leicester Fosse. Next Carnelly moved south in July 1897 to play in the Southern League with Bristol City for two years. In summer 1899 Carnelly signed for Thames Ironworks staying one season and spent a further season in the Southern League with Millwall Athletic.

Carnelly returned to Nottingham in 1901 and after regaining amateur status in 1903 finished his playing career with Nottingham Corporation Tramways.

Honours
with Bristol City
Southern Football League runners-up: 1897–98
Southern Football League runners-up: 1898–99

References

1870 births
1920 deaths
Footballers from Nottingham
English footballers
Association football forwards
English Football League players
Southern Football League players
Midland Football League players
Loughborough F.C. players
Nottingham Forest F.C. players
Leicester City F.C. players
Bristol City F.C. players
Thames Ironworks F.C. players
Millwall F.C. players
Ilkeston Town F.C. (1880s) players